Ohio's 12th congressional district is a United States congressional district in central Ohio, covering Athens County, Coshocton County, Fairfield County, Guernsey County, Knox County, Licking County, Morgan County, Muskingum County and Perry County along with parts of Delaware, Holmes and Tuscarawas counties. The district includes communities east of Columbus including Zanesville, Cambridge, and Mount Vernon. It is currently represented by Troy Balderson, a member of the Republican Party. Balderson took office following a special election held on August 7, 2018, to replace Rep. Pat Tiberi, who had resigned on January 15, 2018. Balderson was then re-elected in the 2018 general election two months later.

From 2003 to 2013 the district included eastern Columbus, including most of its heavily African-American neighborhoods. The district also took in most of its northern suburbs, including Westerville. It was one of two districts that split the state's capital city, the other being the 15th District. For most of the time from the 1980s to the 2000s, it was considered to be less Republican than the 15th, in part due to its large black population. However, redistricting after the 2010 census drew nearly all of the 15th's black constituents into the 3rd District, while the 15th was pushed into more exurban and Republican areas north and east of the capital.

It has been in Republican hands since 1920, except for an eight-year stretch in the 1930s and a two-year term in 1980 where the Democratic Party held the seat; in both instances the Democratic incumbent was later defeated by a GOP challenger. In the 2004 presidential election George W. Bush narrowly won the district against John Kerry, 51% to 49%.   However, in the 2008 presidential election, Democratic candidate Barack Obama won the 12th district by a margin of 53% to 46%. After the 2011 redistricting cycle, the district has since been won in larger margins by Republican presidential candidates.

In the 2018 special election, Balderson was endorsed by prominent Republicans including President Donald Trump, Governor of Ohio John Kasich (who represented the 12th from 1983 to 2001), and former Rep. Tiberi. The Democratic candidate was Danny O’Connor. The winner was not immediately clear following the unexpectedly competitive August 7 election. Only on August 24 was Balderson officially declared the winner of the special election, which witnessed a significant swing away from the Republican Party as Balderson won with a margin of less than 1%, while fellow Republican Trump had carried the district by 11% in the 2016 presidential election. In 2020 the district swung heavily back to the Republicans as Balderson won by over 14%.

Election results from presidential races

List of members representing the district

Recent election results 
The following chart shows historic election results.

Historical district boundaries

See also
Ohio's congressional districts
 List of United States congressional districts

References

 Congressional Biographical Directory of the United States 1774–present

12
Constituencies established in 1823
1823 establishments in Ohio
John Kasich